Competitive intelligence (CI) is the process and forward-looking practices used in producing knowledge about the competitive environment to improve organizational performance. It involves the systematic collection and analysis of information from multiple sources, and a coordinated CI program. It is the action of defining, gathering, analyzing, and distributing intelligence about products, customers, competitors, and any aspect of the environment needed to support executives and managers in strategic decision making for an organization.

CI means understanding and learning what is happening in the world outside the business to increase one's competitiveness. It means learning as much as possible, as soon as possible, about one's external environment including one's industry in general and relevant competitors.

Key points
 Competitive intelligence is a legal business practice, as opposed to industrial espionage, which is illegal.
 The focus is on the external business environment.
 There is a process involved in gathering information, converting it into intelligence, and then using it in decision-making. Some CI professionals erroneously emphasize that if the intelligence gathered is not usable or actionable, it is not intelligence.

Another definition of CI regards it as the organizational function responsible for the early identification of risks and opportunities in the market before they become obvious ("early signal analysis"). This definition focuses attention on the difference between dissemination of widely available factual information (such as market statistics, financial reports, newspaper clippings) performed by functions such as libraries and information centers, and competitive intelligence which is a perspective on developments and events aimed at yielding a competitive edge.

The term CI is often viewed as synonymous with competitor analysis, but competitive intelligence is more than analyzing competitors; it embraces the entire environment and stakeholders: customers, competitors, distributors, technologies, and macroeconomic data. It is also a tool for decision making.

Historic development 
CI literature is best exemplified by the bibliographies that were published in the Society of Competitive Intelligence Professionals' academic journal The Journal of Competitive Intelligence and Management. Although elements of organizational intelligence collection have been a part of business for many years, the history of competitive intelligence arguably began in the U.S. in the 1970s, although the literature on the field pre-dates this time by at least several decades. In 1980, Michael Porter published the study Competitive-Strategy: Techniques for Analyzing Industries and Competitors which is widely viewed as the foundation of modern competitive intelligence. This has since been extended most notably by the pair of Craig Fleisher and Babette Bensoussan, who through several popular books on competitive analysis have added 48 commonly applied competitive intelligence analysis techniques to the practitioner's tool box. In 1985, Leonard Fuld published his best selling book dedicated to competitor intelligence. However, the institutionalization of CI as a formal activity among American corporations can be traced to 1988, when Ben and Tamar Gilad published the first organizational model of a formal corporate CI function, which was then adopted widely by US companies. The first professional certification program (CIP) was created in 1996 with the establishment of The Fuld-Gilad-Herring Academy of Competitive Intelligence in Cambridge, Massachusetts.

In 1986, the Society of Competitive Intelligence Professionals (SCIP) was founded in the United States and grew in the late 1990s to around 6,000 members worldwide, mainly in the United States and Canada, but with large numbers especially in the UK and Australia. Due to financial difficulties in 2009, the organization merged with Frost & Sullivan under the Frost & Sullivan Institute. SCIP has since been renamed "Strategic & Competitive Intelligence Professionals" to emphasize the strategic nature of the subject, and also to refocus the organization's general approach, while keeping the existing SCIP brand name and logo. A number of efforts have been made to discuss the field's advances in post-secondary (university) education, covered by several authors including Blenkhorn & Fleisher, Fleisher, Fuld, Prescott, and McGonagle. Although the general view would be that competitive intelligence concepts can be readily found and taught in many business schools around the globe, there are still relatively few dedicated academic programs, majors, or degrees in the field, a concern to academics in the field who would like to see it further researched. These issues were widely discussed by over a dozen knowledgeable individuals in a special edition of the Competitive Intelligence Magazine that was dedicated to this topic. In France, a Specialized Master in Economic Intelligence and Knowledge Management was created in 1995 within the CERAM Business School, now SKEMA Business School, in Paris, with the objective of delivering a full and professional training in Economic Intelligence. A Centre for Global Intelligence and Influence was created in September 2011 in the same School.

Practitioners and companies regard professional accreditation as important in this field. In 2011, SCIP recognized the Fuld-Gilad-Herring Academy of Competitive Intelligence's CIP certification process as its global, dual-level (CIP-I and CIP-II) certification program.

Global developments have also been uneven in competitive intelligence. Several academic journals, particularly the Journal of Competitive Intelligence and Management in its third volume, provided coverage of the field's global development. It is the first European institution which teaches the tactics of economic warfare within a globalizing world. In Germany, competitive intelligence was unattended until the early 1990s. The term "competitive intelligence" first appeared in German literature in 1997. In 1995, a German SCIP chapter was founded, which is now second in terms of membership in Europe. In 2004, the Institute for Competitive Intelligence was founded, which provides a postgraduate certification program for Competitive Intelligence Professionals. Japan is currently the only country that officially maintains an economic intelligence agency (JETRO). It was founded by the Ministry of International Trade and Industry in 1958.

Accepting the importance of competitive intelligence, major multinational corporations, such as ExxonMobil, Procter & Gamble, and Johnson and Johnson, have created formal CI units. Organizations execute competitive intelligence activities not only as a safeguard to protect against market threats and changes, but also as a method for finding new opportunities and trends.

Organizations use competitive intelligence to compare themselves to other organizations ("competitive benchmarking"), to identify risks and opportunities in their markets, and to pressure-test their plans against market response (business wargaming), which enable them to make informed decisions.

One of the major activities involved in corporate competitive intelligence is use of ratio analysis, using key performance indicators (KPI). Organizations compare annual reports of their competitors on certain KPI and ratios, which are intrinsic to their industry. This helps them track their performance, vis-à-vis their competitors.

The actual importance of these categories of information to an organization depends on the contestability of its markets, the organizational culture, the personality and biases of its top decision makers, and the reporting structure of competitive intelligence within the company.

Strategic Intelligence (SI) focuses on the longer term, looking at issues affecting a company's competitiveness over the course of a couple of years. The actual time horizon for SI ultimately depends on the industry and how quickly it's changing. The general questions that SI answers are, ‘Where should we as a company be in X years?' and 'What are the strategic risks and opportunities facing us?' This type of intelligence work involves among others the identification of weak signals and application of methodology and process called Strategic Early Warning (SEW), first introduced by Gilad, followed by Steven Shaker and Victor Richardson, Alessandro Comai and Joaquin Tena, and others. According to Gilad, 20% of the work of competitive intelligence practitioners should be dedicated to strategic early identification of weak signals within a SEW framework.

Tactical Intelligence: the focus is on providing information designed to improve shorter-term decisions, most often related with the intent of growing market share or revenues. Generally, it is the type of information that a person would need to support the sales process in an organization. It investigates various aspects of a product/product line marketing.

With the right amount of information, organizations can avoid unpleasant surprises by anticipating competitors' moves and decreasing response time. Examples of competitive intelligence research is evident in daily newspapers, such as The Wall Street Journal, Business Week, and Fortune. Major airlines change hundreds of fares daily in response to competitors' tactics. They use information to plan their own marketing, pricing, and production strategies.

Resources, such as the Internet, have made gathering information on competitors easy. Analysts can discover future trends and market requirements. However, competitive intelligence is much more than this, as the ultimate aim is to lead to competitive advantage. As the Internet is mostly public domain material, information gathered is less likely to result in insights that will be unique to the company. There is a risk that information gathered from the Internet will be misinformation and mislead users, so competitive intelligence researchers are often wary of using such information.

As a result, although the Internet is viewed as a key source, most CI professionals should spend their time and budget gathering intelligence using primary research—networking with industry experts, from trade shows and conferences, from their own customers and suppliers, and so on. Where the Internet is used, it is to gather sources for primary research as well as information on what the company says about itself and its online presence (in the form of links to other companies, its strategy regarding search engines and online advertising, mentions in discussion forums and on blogs, etc.). Online subscription databases and news aggregation sources, which have simplified the secondary source collection process, are also used.

Recent trends 

The technical advances in massively parallel processing offered by the Hadoop "big data" architecture has allowed the creation of multiple platforms for named-entity recognition such as the Apache Projects OpenNLP and Apache Stanbol. The former includes pre-trained statistical parsers that can discern elements key to establishing trends and evaluating competitive positions and responding appropriately. Public information mining from SEC.gov, Federal Contract Awards, social media, vendors, and competitor websites now permits real-time counterintelligence as a strategy for horizontal and vertical market expansion and product positioning. This occurs in an automated fashion on massive marketplaces such as Amazon.com and their classification and prediction of product associations and purchase probability.
	
A new industry emerged of tech companies with tools that simplify and automate the way companies conduct competitive intelligence. With technology responsible for scraping billions of pieces of data and pulling it into a central platform, this new trend of competitive intelligence tools has effectively reshaped how competitor analysis is performed and intelligence gathered.

Similar fields 
Competitive intelligence has been influenced by national strategic intelligence. Although national intelligence was researched 50 years ago, competitive intelligence was introduced during the 1990s. Competitive intelligence professionals can learn from national-intelligence experts, especially in the analysis of complex situations. Competitive intelligence may be confused with (or seen to overlap) environmental scanning, business intelligence , and market research. Craig Fleisher questions the appropriateness of the term, comparing it to business intelligence, competitor intelligence, knowledge management, market intelligence, marketing research, and strategic intelligence.

Fleisher suggests that business intelligence has two forms. Its narrow (contemporary) form is more focused on information technology and internal focus than CI, while its broader (historical) definition is more inclusive than CI. Knowledge management (KM), when improperly achieved, is seen as an information-technology driven organizational practice relying on data mining, corporate intranets and mapping organizational assets to make it accessible to organization members for decision-making. CI shares some aspects of KM; they are human-intelligence- and experience-based for a more-sophisticated qualitative analysis. km is essential for effective change. A key effective factor is a powerful, dedicated IT system executing the full intelligence cycle.

Market intelligence (MI) is industry-targeted intelligence developed in real-time aspects of competitive events taking place among the four Ps of the marketing mix (pricing, place, promotion and product) in the product (or service) marketplace to better understand the market's attractiveness. A time-based competitive tactic, MI is used by marketing and sales managers to respond to consumers more quickly in the marketplace. Fleisher suggests it is not distributed as widely as some forms of CI, which are also distributed to non-marketing decision-makers. Market intelligence has a shorter time horizon than other intelligence areas, and is measured in days, weeks, or (in slower-moving industries) months.

Market research is a tactical, method-driven field consisting of neutral, primary research of customer data (beliefs and perceptions) gathered in surveys or focus groups, and is analyzed with statistical-research techniques. CI draws on a wider variety (primary and secondary) of sources from a wider range of stakeholders (suppliers, competitors, distributors, substitutes and media) to answer existing questions, raise new ones and guide action.

Ben Gilad and Jan Herring lay down a set of prerequisites defining CI, distinguishing it from other information-rich disciplines such as market research or business development. They show that a common body of knowledge and a unique set of tools (key intelligence topics, business war games and blindspots analysis) distinguish CI; while other sensory activities in a commercial firm focus on one segment of the market (customers, suppliers or acquisition targets), CI synthesizes data from all high-impact players (HIP).

Gilad later focused his delineation of CI on the difference between information and intelligence. According to him, the common denominator among organizational sensory functions (whether they are called market research, business intelligence or market intelligence) is that they deliver information rather than intelligence. Intelligence, says Gilad, is a perspective on facts rather than the facts themselves. Unique among corporate functions, competitive intelligence has a perspective of risks and opportunities for a firm's performance; as such, it (not information activities) is part of an organization's risk-management activity.

Ethics 
Ethics has been a long-held issue of discussion among CI practitioners. The questions revolve around what is and is not allowable in terms of CI activity. Several scholarly treatments have been generated on this topic, most prominently addressed through Society of Competitive Intelligence Professionals publications. The book Competitive Intelligence Ethics: Navigating the Gray Zone provides nearly twenty separate views about ethics in CI, as well as another 10 codes used by various individuals or organizations. Combining that with the over two dozen scholarly articles or studies found within the various CI bibliographic entries, it is clear that no shortage of study has gone into better classifying, understanding, and addressing CI ethics.

Competitive information may be obtained from public or subscription sources, from networking with competitor staff or customers, disassembly of competitor products or from field research interviews. Competitive intelligence research is distinguishable from industrial espionage, as CI practitioners generally abide by local legal guidelines and ethical business norms.

Outsourcing 
Outsourcing has become a big business for competitive intelligence professionals. There are many different companies in this field, including market research and consulting firms.

See also 

 Business intelligence
 Commercial intelligence
 Competitor analysis
 Due diligence
 Economic and industrial espionage
 Industry or market research
 Information broker
 Legal case management
 Location intelligence
 Market research
 Marketing analysis
 Open-source intelligence
 Porter's four corners model
 Society of Competitive Intelligence Professionals
 Sourcing (personnel)
 SWOT analysis
 Trend analysis

References

External links 
 Competitive Intelligence - Explained With Maps (documentary)
 Competitive Intelligence - Part 1 (quick pdf short course)
 Competitive Intelligence - Part 2 (quick pdf short course)
 Competitive Intelligence Definition - Investopedia

 
Innovation economics
Business intelligence terms
Competition (economics)
Market intelligence